Mendy and the Golem, originally written by Leibel Estrin and later by Matt Brandstein, is the name of two American comic book series featuring Jewish characters.

The original was a slapstick comedy aimed primarily at children. The second series straddles a variety of genres, including swashbuckling adventures with elements of fantasy, mystery, and science fiction, while retaining slapstick humor offset by dashes of satire and political and cultural commentary.

Publication history
The first Mendy and the Golem series followed the exploits of Mendy Klein, who found a Golem in their father's synagogue. The Klein siblings and their Golem (named Sholem) get into all sorts of scrapes, and walk out of them with a moral based on Jewish texts.

In the second series, the Kleins have created a modern-day Golem with the assistance of the venerable Reb Zushe, an aging Rabbinical scholar. This version of the characters originated as a series of comic strips, Mendy's Fun Page that ran weekly in Jewish newspapers in North America and Australia, beginning in 1997.

1981 series
Billed as "The World's Only Kosher Comic Book", Mendy Enterprises' Mendy and the Golem first appeared in 1981. Written by Leibel Estrin and drawn by Dovid Sears, the comic book featured the offbeat misadventures of Mendy, an Orthodox Jewish boy, and his pet Golem. Other characters include Mendy's parents, Rabbi Yaakov and Sara Klein; Mendy's sister, Rivky; and a host of colorful supporting characters such as Moshe the Mayven; the Lone Stranger and his faithful friend Toronto; Captain Video; Dr. Hardheart and his evil robot Oy Vayder; and Professor Nemo.

Nineteen issues were produced.

2003 series
A new Mendy and the Golem series appeared in 2003, published by The Golem Factory. Under editor-in-chief Tani Pinson, it was written by Matt Brandstein and featured art by Stan Goldberg, Ernie Colón and Joe Rubinstein.

External links
 Mendy and the Golem official site (preserved at the Internet Archive from Oct. 25, 2005)
 Independent Heroes from the U.S.A.: Mendy's Golem
 How 'Mendy and the Golem' Became the First Kosher Comic Book
 Mendy and the Golem (1981) at the Comic Books Database
 The first 'Mendy and the Golem' series online

Chabad-Lubavitch (Hasidic dynasty)
American comics titles
Jewish American literature
Fictional golems
1981 comics debuts
2003 comics debuts
Jewish-related comics